

Decades and years

 01
Poetry by century